Idolatteria bichroma is a species of moth of the family Tortricidae. It is found in Carchi Province, Ecuador.

The wingspan is about 17 mm. The ground colour of the forewings is dark orange rust. The markings are brownish black. The hindwings are orange with a broad dark brown terminal area.

Etymology
The species name refers to the colouration of the hindwing and is derived from Greek bi (meaning double) and chroma (meaning colour).

References

Moths described in 2008
Archipini
Moths of South America
Taxa named by Józef Razowski